The greater broad-nosed bat (Platyrrhinus vittatus) is a species of bat in the family Phyllostomidae. It is found in Bolivia, Colombia, Costa Rica, Ecuador, Panama, Peru, and Venezuela.

References

Platyrrhinus
Mammals of Colombia
Mammals described in 1860
Taxonomy articles created by Polbot
Taxa named by Wilhelm Peters
Bats of South America
Bats of Central America